Parry P. Gripp (born September 22, 1967) is an American musician and singer-songwriter. He is the lead vocalist and guitarist for the pop punk band Nerf Herder from its formation in 1994. Gripp has written numerous novelty songs for children, and has been featured on several Disney television shows.

Early life 
Parry P. Gripp was born in Santa Barbara on September 22, 1967. His sister Alice and he are co-owners of the Santa Barbara Orchid Estate where he grew up. The estate was founded by Robert J. Chrisman in 1957, and was purchased in 1967 by his father Paul Gripp, who helped establish it. Paul Gripp ran the estate until his retirement in 1986. In 1994, the band Nerf Herder formed with Gripp as the lead singer and guitarist.

Style and works

Nerf Herder songs 
Gripp's band Nerf Herder is known for their very unique sound, including comedic, juvenile, and pop-culture referencing lyrics coming off of the pop-punk movement while pioneering geek rock. Nerf Herder songs use references from various iconic franchises to relate to real-life experiences, like how the song "Ghostbusters III" uses the third installment of the Ghostbusters franchise that was never going to happen as a metaphor for his romantic dreams ever coming true. For instruments, these songs commonly use a typical bass-heavy punk arrangement with integrated synthesizers spread throughout the song. Gripp's importance in the nerd music world has led him to collaborate with various nerdcore rappers like MC Lars and MC Frontalot.

False jingles and other novelty songs
As a songwriter, Gripp is known for fake jingles, as in his 2005 solo album For Those About to Shop, We Salute You - a 51-track concept album mimicking various musical styles as product commercials. It does not have one single concept; it goes through many various concept suites, such as trucks, beer, and insomnia. He also maintained a song-of-the-week website in December 2007 and a YouTube channel on August 12, 2006, in which he creates soundtracks to internet memes, as well as music videos for his own novelty songs. In January 2017, "It's Raining Tacos" was featured in an Amazon.com ad which began airing in early May 2017.

The Wawa and Hallmark connections
Along with his phony jingles, Gripp also has created some true advertising music, such as a series of Beatles-inspired tunes promoting the Wawa Food Markets' summertime Hoagiefests and songs for the Hallmark Cards e-characters Hoops & Yoyo.

Television theme songs
Gripp also performs The Super Hero Squad Show, Ben 10: Omniverse, The 7D, and StoryBots Super Songs theme songs.

Gripp also joined forces with MC Lars to perform some of the vocals, including the chorus to "Guitar Hero Hero (Beating Guitar Hero Doesn't Make You Slash)", a song commenting on the notion that video games like Guitar Hero take kids away from playing in bands and actually learning their instruments.

On July 9, 2009, Gripp debuted a new song called "The Girl at the Video Game Store" for the 1000th episode of the G4 TV program Attack of the Show! The video features the show's hosts Olivia Munn as the title character and Kevin Pereira on drums.

In October 2016, Gripp performed and wrote the theme song for the Netflix children's show StoryBots Super Songs, a spin-off for Ask the StoryBots. He also started performing and writing songs for both shows.

His 2011 released song "Space Unicorn" was featured in Daron Nefcy's Star vs. the Forces of Evil as a ringtone of character Marco Diaz's cellphone.

In July 2012, the National Geographic Kids website uploaded his video, "Spooky Spider".

In April 2013, Gripp recorded the song "Backyard Hodge Podge" for the episode of the same name for the children's television show Phineas and Ferb, and he also appeared in the episode in animated form.

Gripp has written songs for Vivienne Medrano's adult animated webseries Hazbin Hotel and its spinoff Helluva Boss, as well as the song "Monster Fighting Time" for the "Bad Luck Jack" ZooPhobia short.

Children's music 
Gripp has written numerous songs for children, with over 100 songs appearing on his YouTube channel, with over 250 million views. Gripp has released five albums for children, Do You Like Waffles?, Fuzzy Fuzzy Cute Cute, Vol. 1, Mega-Party, Jingle Burgers, and For Kids About to Rock.

Between early 2017 and late 2019, Gripp's "Raining Tacos" became notable due to its popularity within Roblox's player base. It was also used by the city of West Palm Beach to deter homeless people from congregating in some areas, along with the song "Baby Shark". Gripp requested they remove his title from their playlist and made donations to local homeless shelters.

Recurring themes 
Iconic William Shatner character Captain Kirk from the Star Trek franchise holds a special significance in Gripp's songs with Nerf Herder. For example, he dresses like Kirk in the video for the song "Mr. Spock", in which the lyrics of the second verse suggest Captain Kirk is extremely heroic, but girls only want to go out with Mr. Spock and in the song "At the Con" he mentions cosplaying as Kirk at comic book conventions with the lyric "All week I've been slaving like a jerk, now I'm gonna dress like Captain Kirk, beam me up tonight!". Over the course of Nerf Herder's discography, Gripp has also sung about his childhood crush Vivian in the songs "Born Weird" and "Vivian". Another Nerf Herder trope is songs about interest in girls with specific taste in music narrowed down to a genre or band in tracks such as "The Girl Who Listened to Rush", "Pantera Fans in Love" and "New Wave Girl".

In his solo releases, Gripp's songs are commonly about animals and food, though some food and animals in a series of songs collected in Gripp's Spotify playlists such as "The Raining Tacos Saga" (featuring songs "Raining Tacos", "TacoBot 3000", and "Quesadilla Explosion", all songs about Mexican food) and "Scary Parry Gripp Halloween Playlist" (featuring songs like "Zombies Want Your Candy", "Haunted Cupcake" and "Frankenturtle", all songs that relate a spooky Halloween element to animals or food).

Awards and nominations

Discography 

 For Those About to Shop, We Salute You (2005)
 Do You Like Waffles? (2008)
 Jingle Burgers – A Parry Gripp Christmas Album (2020)

References

External links
 
 Gripp YouTube channel

1967 births
American male singer-songwriters
American rock songwriters
American rock singers
Living people
Musicians from Santa Barbara, California
Singer-songwriters from California
Nerf Herder members